Visa requirements for Canadian citizens are administrative entry restrictions by the authorities of other states placed on citizens of Canada.  Canadian citizens have visa-free or visa on arrival access to 189 countries and territories, ranking the Canadian passport 3rd in the world in terms of freedom of travel (tied with the passport of Germany) according to the Henley & Partners Passport Index.

Visa requirements

List of countries

Dependent, disputed, or restricted territories
Visa requirements for Canadian citizens for visits to various territories, disputed areas, partially recognized countries, and restricted zones:

Africa
 — special permit required.
  (outside Asmara) — visa covers Asmara only; to travel in the rest of the country, a Travel Permit for Foreigners is required (20 Eritrean nakfa).
  — Visa not required for 90 days with a 180-day period.
  — Visa not required for 90 days within a 180-day period.

 — eVisa for 2 months within any year period
 — Visitor's Pass granted on arrival valid for 4/10/21/60/90 days for 12/14/16/20/25 pound sterling.
 — Permission to land required for 15/30 pounds sterling (yacht/ship passenger) for Tristan da Cunha Island or 20 pounds sterling for Gough Island, Inaccessible Island or Nightingale Islands.
 (Western Sahara controlled territory) — undefined visa regime.
 — visa required (30 days for 30 US dollars, payable on arrival).

Asia
 Hainan — Visa on arrival for 15 days. Available at Haikou Meilan International Airport and Sanya Phoenix International Airport.Visa not required for 15 days for traveling as part of a tourist group (5 or more people)
 — Visa not required for 3 months.
 — Protected Area Permit (PAP) required for all of Arunachal Pradesh, Manipur, Mizoram and parts of Himachal Pradesh, Jammu and Kashmir and Uttarakhand. Restricted Area Permit (RAP) required for all of Andaman and Nicobar Islands and Lakshadweep and parts of Sikkim. Some of these requirements are occasionally lifted for a year.
 - Visa on arrival for 15 days. Available at Sulaimaniyah International Airport and Erbil International Airport.
 — Visa not required for 30 days.
 outside Pyongyang – People are not allowed to leave the capital city, tourists can only leave the capital with a governmental tourist guide (no independent moving)
 Gorno-Badakhshan Autonomous Province — OIVR permit required (15+5 Tajikistani Somoni) and another special permit (free of charge) is required for Lake Sarez.
 Tibet Autonomous Region — Tibet Travel Permit required.
 Korean Demilitarized Zone — restricted zone.
 UNDOF Zone and Ghajar — restricted zones.
 — Certain countries will deny access to holders of Israeli visas or passport stamps of Israel because of the Arab League boycott of Israel.
 — Non-Muslims are not allowed in Mecca or Medina.

Caribbean and North Atlantic
 — Visa not required for 3 months.
 — Visa not required for 30 days.
 — Visa not required.
 Bonaire, St. Eustatius and Saba — Visa not required for 3 months.
 — Visa not required.
 — Visa not required for 6 months.
 — Visa not required for 3 months.
 — Visa not required for 6 months.
 — Visa not required for 180 days, same as the United States mainland. 
 — Visa not required for 3 months.
 — Visa not required for 90 days.
 — Visa not required for 6 months, same as the United States mainland.

Europe
 — Visa required. Visa on arrival available if arriving from Russian border only by train or car and must possess a multi entry Russian visa to be eligible and must exit via Russian border only. 
  Mount Athos — Special permit required (4 days: 25 euro for Orthodox visitors, 35 euro for non-Orthodox visitors, 18 euro for students). There is a visitors' quota: maximum 100 Orthodox and 10 non-Orthodox per day and women are not allowed.
 Brest and Grodno — Visa not required for 10 days.
 Crimea — Visa issued by Russia is required.
 — Visa free access for 3 months. Passport required.
 UN Buffer Zone in Cyprus — Access Permit is required for travelling inside the zone, except Civil Use Areas.
 — Visa not required.
 Jan Mayen — permit issued by the local police required for staying for less than 24 hours and permit issued by the Norwegian police for staying for more than 24 hours.
 of  — Right to live and work under the Svalbard Treaty.
 — visa free for 90 days.
 — Visa required (issued for single entry for 21 days/1/2/3 months or multiple entry visa for 1/2/3 months). Travellers with a visa (expired or valid) or evidence of travel to Republic of Artsakh (also known as Nagorno-Karabakh) will be permanently denied entry to Azerbaijan.
 — Visa free. Multiple entry visa to Russia and three-day prior notification are required to enter South Ossetia.
 — Visa free. Registration required after 24h.

Oceania
 — Electronic authorization for 30 days.
 Ashmore and Cartier Islands — special authorisation required.
 Clipperton Island — special permit required.
 — Visa free access for 31 days.
 — Visa not required. 
 — Visa on arrival valid for 30 days is issued free of charge.
 — Visa not required.
 — 14 days visa free and landing fee US$35 or tax of US$5 if not going ashore.
 United States Minor Outlying Islands — special permits required for Baker Island, Howland Island, Jarvis Island, Johnston Atoll, Kingman Reef, Midway Atoll, Palmyra Atoll and Wake Island.

South America
  Galápagos — Online pre-registration is required. Transit Control Card must also be obtained at the airport prior to departure.

South Atlantic and Antarctica
 — Visitor Permit valid for 4 weeks is issued on arrival.
 — Pre-arrival permit from the commissioner required (72 hours/1 month for 110/160 pounds sterling).

Consular protection of Canadian citizens abroad

Canada has diplomatic and consular offices (including honorary consuls) in over 270 locations in approximately 180 foreign countries. In some countries Canadians may receive consular assistance from Australian missions under the Canada–Australia Consular Services Sharing Agreement. On the last page of a standard Canadian passport, under "Reach Us", it states "In case of an emergency you can reach us by: contacting the nearest Canadian government office (in countries where there is no Canadian office, you should contact the nearest British or Australian office...".

Non-visa restrictions

Visa requirements amendment log
Visa requirements for Canadian citizens were lifted by Austria in 1956, Finland in 1958, Japan (20 September 1964), Micronesia (18 December 1980), Taiwan (1 January 1994), Ukraine (1 August 2005), Kyrgyzstan (27 July 2012), Mongolia (1 January 2014), Kazakhstan (1 January 2017), Argentina (1 January 2018), Armenia (10 July 2018), and Brazil (17 June 2019).

Canadian citizens were made eligible for eVisas by India (1 May 2015), Brazil (25 January 2018, visa free since 17 June 2019) and Angola (30 March 2018).

Foreign travel statistics

See also

 Visa policy of Canada
 Canadian passport

Notes

References

External links
Travel Reports & Warnings - Foreign Affairs and International Trade Canada
Directory of Canadian Government Offices Abroad - Foreign Affairs and International Trade Canada

Canada
Foreign relations of Canada